Lavinia Elaine Greenlaw (born 30 July 1962) is an English poet, novelist and non-fiction writer. She won the Prix du Premier Roman with her first novel and her poetry has been shortlisted for awards that include the T. S. Eliot Prize, Forward Prize and Whitbread Poetry Prize. Her 2014 Costa Poetry Award was for A Double Sorrow: A Version of Troilus and Criseyde. Greenlaw currently holds the post of Professor of Creative Writing (Poetry) at Royal Holloway, University of London.

Biography

Lavinia Greenlaw was born in London into a medical and scientific family, and has a sister and two brothers. When she was aged 11, the family moved from London to an Essex village, where they lived for seven years. This period Greenlaw has described as "an interim time", with "memories of time being arrested, nothing much happening."

Greenlaw went on to read modern arts at Kingston Polytechnic. She then studied at the London College of Printing and gained an MA in art history from the Courtauld Institute. She was employed as an editor at Imperial College of Science and Technology (1985–1986) and with the publishers Allison & Busby (1986–1987),  and subsequently with Earthscan (1988–90). She also worked as an arts administrator for Southbank Centre (1990–1991) and the London Arts Board (1991–1994).

Greenlaw's career as a freelance artist, critic and broadcaster began in 1994. She became the first artist-in-residence at the Science Museum (1994–1995), and has since held residences at the Royal Festival Hall, at a London solicitors' firm (1997–1998), and at the Royal Society of Medicine (2004). In 2013 she won an Engagement Fellowship from the Wellcome Trust. Her sound work Audio Obscura was commissioned in 2011 by Artangel and Manchester International Festival, and heard at Manchester Piccadilly station in July 2011 and London St Pancras station in September and October 2011. It won the 2011 Ted Hughes Award for New Work in Poetry, the judges calling it "groundbreaking".

Greenlaw taught at Goldsmiths College, University of London. She served as professor of creative writing at the University of East Anglia from 2007 to 2013, and as a visiting professor at King's College London (2015–2016) and Freie Universität Berlin (2017). She currently holds the post of Professor of Creative Writing (Poetry) at Royal Holloway, University of London.

After judging the 2010 Manchester Poetry Prize, Greenlaw chaired in 2014 the judging panel for the inaugural Folio Prize. She is a Council member of the Royal Society of Literature and a former Chair of the Poetry Society.

Greenlaw has lived in London for most of her life.

Writing
Primarily a poet, Greenlaw has also written novels, short stories, plays and non-fiction. She has made radio documentaries. Her work for music includes the libretto for the opera Peter Pan composed by Richard Ayres (Staatsoper Stuttgart/Komische Oper Berlin/Welsh National Opera and Royal Opera House, 2015). Publications for which she has written include the London Review of Books, The Guardian and The New Yorker, and in 2019 she was a contributor to A New Divan: A Lyrical Dialogue Between East and West (Gingko Library).

Her work draws on her interest in science and scientific enquiry and covers themes of displacement, loss and belonging. Critics have seen her poetry as remarkable for its precision; her best contain a complexity and elusiveness that lead them to "appreciate with each re-reading".

Her biography notes: "She has written and adapted several dramas for radio, including Virginia Woolf's Night and Day, Hermann Hesse's The Glass Bead Game, and a series on malaria called Five Fever Tales. She has made documentaries about Emily Dickinson and Elizabeth Bishop and several programmes about light, including trips to the Arctic midsummer and midwinter, the Baltic, the darkest place in England, light in London, and the solstices and equinoxes."

Greenlaw is also a memoirist. Kirkus Reviews summed up her 2007 coming-of-age book, The Importance of Music to Girls, by saying: "The taut, lyric thrum of Greenlaw's prose reflects her poet's skill....Well-written, bewitching and subtly dazzling." Some Answers Without Questions (2021), part memoir, part manifesto, was described by Hephzibah Anderson in The Observer as "a delight: approachable, rigorous and omnivorous in its frame of reference".

Awards and recognition
Lavinia Greenlaw received an Eric Gregory Award in 1990, an Arts Council Writers' Award in 1995, a Cholmondeley Award, and a Society of Authors Travelling Scholarship. In 1994 she was chosen as one of 20 New Generation Poets, by a jury composed of Melvyn Bragg, Margaret Busby, Vicki Feather, Michael Longley, John Osborne and James Wood. In 1997, Greenlaw won the Forward Prize for Best Single Poem for "A World Where News Travelled Slowly", the title poem from her second main collection.

For her 2001 first novel, Mary George of Allnorthover, Greenlaw won the French Prix du Premier Roman. She has been shortlisted for a number of literary awards, including the Whitbread Book Award (now the Costa Book Awards) and the T. S. Eliot Prize for Poetry. Her sound work Audio Obscura won the 2011 Ted Hughes Award for New Work in Poetry. Her short story "We Are Watching Something Terrible Happening" was shortlisted for the BBC National Short Story Award 2013.

Selected works
The Cost of Getting Lost in Space (poetry), Turret Books, 1991, 
Love from a Foreign City (poetry), Slow Dancer Press, 1992, 
Night Photograph (poetry; shortlisted for Whitbread and Forward Poetry Prizes), Faber & Faber, 1993, 
A World Where News Travelled Slowly (poetry), Faber, 1997, 
Mary George of Allnorthover (novel; Prix du Premier Roman Etranger), Flamingo, 9 July 2001, 
Minsk (poetry; shortlisted for T. S. Eliot, Forward and Whitbread Poetry Prizes), Faber, 2003, 
Thoughts of a Night Sea (photographs by Garry Fabian Miller), Merrell, 2003, 
An Irresponsible Age (novel), Fourth Estate, 2006, 
The Importance of Music to Girls (memoir), Faber, 2007, 
The Casual Perfect (poetry), Faber, 2011, 
Questions of Travel: William Morris in Iceland (non-fiction), Notting Hill Editions, 2011, .
A Double Sorrow: Troilus and Criseyde (poetry), Faber, 2014, 
In the City of Love's Sleep (novel), Faber, 2018, 
The Built Moment (poetry), Faber, 2019, 
Some Answers Without Questions (memoir/manifesto), Faber, 2021,

Translations

Television
Greenlaw appeared as a "talking head" on the BBC documentaries Top of the Pops: The Story of 1976 (2011) and The Joy of the Single (2012).

References

External links
Lavinia Greenlaw website.

Lavinia Greenlaw at FSG
Lavinia Greenlaw at the Poetry Archive. Retrieved 26 October 2011.
Charlotte Runcie, "Something borrowed, something blue" (interview), The Telegraph, 23 February 2014.
"Professor Lavinia Greenlaw", Royal Holloway, University of London

1962 births
Living people
20th-century English poets
20th-century English women writers
21st-century English novelists
21st-century English poets
21st-century English women writers
Academics of Goldsmiths, University of London
Academics of Royal Holloway, University of London
Academics of the University of East Anglia
Alumni of Kingston University
Alumni of the Courtauld Institute of Art
British women memoirists
English women novelists
English women poets
Fellows of the Royal Society of Literature
Writers from London